Events from the year 1545 in France.

Incumbents
 Monarch – Francis I

Events
 

 
 July 18–19 – Battle of the Solent between English and French fleets. The engagement is inconclusive but on July 19 Henry VIII of England's flagship, the Mary Rose, sinks.
 c. July 21 – Battle of Bonchurch: The English reverse an attempted French invasion of the Isle of Wight off the coast of England as part of the Italian Wars.

Births
 
 

 
 April 2 – Elisabeth of Valois, queen of Philip II of Spain (d. 1568)
 May 1 – Franciscus Junius, French theologian (d. 1602)

Deaths

 July 7 – Pernette Du Guillet, poet (b. c. 1520)

See also

References

1540s in France